Lorena Vindel (born 1977) is a Honduran actress and artist.

Biography
Lorena Vindel began her artistic training at the Experimental Children's Music School in Tegucigalpa, and continued it at the National School of Music. From 1996 to 1998, she studied art history at the Universidad Nacional Autónoma de Honduras. At the same time she performed at the Teatro Zambra. In 1998, she emigrated to Spain, where she continued her training with acting and musical studies. She started working as a theatrical actress and obtained supporting, extra, and double roles in Spanish films. In 2008, she won the Best New Actress award at the Toulouse Spanish Film Festival for her role in Seven Billiard Tables. In 2010, she won the lead role in the film , released in 2011.

In 2014, she returned to Honduras to create a performance art piece called Madre Tierra, inspired by biblical texts and local traditions.

Awards
 2008: Best New Actress at the Toulouse Spanish Film Festival

Filmography

Television

Film

References

External links
 

1977 births
21st-century actresses
Film actresses
Honduran actresses
Living people
People from Tegucigalpa
Performance artists
Universidad Nacional Autónoma de Honduras alumni
Women performance artists
Honduran women artists